Bogusław Leśnodorski (27 May 1914 – 1 July 1985) was a Polish historian, professor of the University of Warsaw and author of many books and articles. He was editor of "Kwartalnik Historyczny" from 1953 to 1974.

Further reading
Anna Rosner: Bogusław Leśnodorski. In: Profesorowie Wydziału Prawa i Administracji Uniwersytetu Warszawskiego 1808-2008. Grażyna Bałtruszajtys (red.). Wyd. 1. Warszawa: Lexis-Nexis, 2008, s. 267-269. .

References

External links
Article about Bogusław Leśnodorski

1914 births
1985 deaths
20th-century Polish historians
Polish male non-fiction writers
Recipients of the State Award Badge (Poland)